Ernest of Bavaria (17 December 1554 – 17 February 1612) was Prince-elector-archbishop of the Archbishopric of Cologne from 1583 to 1612 as successor of the expelled Gebhard Truchsess von Waldburg. He was also bishop of Münster, Hildesheim, Freising and Liège.

Life
Ernest was born in Munich, the son of Albert V, Duke of Bavaria, and Anna of Austria. Duke Albert had destined his third son, Ernest, for the clerical vocation. He was educated and trained by the Jesuits. In 1565 he became a canon at Salzburg, and soon afterward at Cologne, Treves, and Würzburg as well; in the autumn of 1565, at the age of twelve, he likewise was elected bishop of Freising. Albert's wishes no doubt centered upon the neighboring archdiocese of Salzburg; but in 1569, when Elector Salentin VII of Isenburg-Grenzau incurred difficulties with the curia for non-recognition of the Council of Trent and was contemplating resignation, Ernest was proposed by his father, who had the support of the Spanish government at Brussels, as Salentin's successor. At the imperial Diet of Speyer (1570), the negotiations with Salentin were so far advanced that Ernest went to Cologne in November, and served his first residence there as canon till May 1571, such being the preliminary condition in the line of election.

Salentin's resignation, however, was deferred, and in 1573 he actually submitted to the Council of Trent, and was thereupon confirmed by the curia as archbishop, foregoing the priestly consecration. That year instead saw Ernest elected, at the age of 19, as bishop of the small see of Hildesheim. In 1577, after the Bavarian court had failed in an attempt to secure Münster for Ernest, efforts looking to Cologne were resumed and prosecuted more zealously than before. Moreover, the support of the curia now heightened the hope of some practical result. Duke Ernest, who for a time, in 1572, had well-nigh thwarted all his father's plans by a suddenly outcropping disinclination to save the spiritual vocation, was sent to Rome in the spring of 1574, for a sojourn of nearly two years, by way of reward for submitting to his father's will. At Rome he won the particular good-will of the pope, so that Gregory XIII resolved to support, with all his might, Ernest's installation as coadjutor to Salentin; in fact, the advancement of Bavarian family interests appeared to be the only possible way of recovering a more secure standing for the Roman Catholic Church in Lower Germany. The status which had been gained by the election of Ernest to Hildesheim could not as yet, by itself alone, afford a very trustworthy base of support.

But against the common plans of Salentin, the curial, and Bavarian court opposition manifested itself on the side of the chapter at Cologne; when, in 1577, Salentin resigned, Ernest was defeated at the new election by twelve votes to ten by Gebhard Truchsess von Waldburg, who was elected by the Protestants and the lukewarm Catholics of the chapter. Duke Albert, as well as the papal nuncio at Cologne, Bartolomeo Portia, protested against the election; but as both the emperor and the electors espoused Gebhard's cause, and as he passed for a good Catholic, receiving priestly consecration in March 1578, and swearing to the Council of Trent, the curia disregarded the Bavarian protest and in March 1580, confirmed the election.

In 1581 Ernest was elected the Bishop of Liège.  When Archbishop Gebhard of Truchsess Waldburg converted to Protestantism in 1583, Ernest was elected Archbishop of Cologne on 22 May 1583. With Spanish and Bavarian troops he quickly drove Gebhard into Werl in the Cologne War ( or ). In 1584 he was elected the Bishop of Münster, and also in that year the Papacy nuntiator was published. The Archbishopric of Cologne was important because it was one of the seven Imperial Electors of Holy Roman Emperor, and as three of them were already Protestant, if Cologne was ruled by a Protestant a Protestant Emperor could be elected.

By now he was the Archbishop of Cologne and the Bishop of Liège, Münster, Freising and Hildesheim, and he was called the protector of Roman Catholicism in northwestern Germany. He was an ardent supporter of the Counter-Reformation, and assisted the Catholics in Jülich-Cleves-Berg and Baden. In 1595 he selected his nephew Ferdinand of Bavaria to be the coadjutor of the bishoprics and retired from most secular affairs.

Ernest died in 1612 in Arnsberg, Westphalia, and was buried in Cologne Cathedral. He was succeeded by Ferdinand of Bavaria.

Ancestry

References

External links 

 Ernest of Bavaria – the Prince-Bishop of Liege in modern Europe, 400th anniversary
 Tripota – Trier portrait database
 Ernest of Bavaria in the Portal of Rhenish History
 
 Porträt von Frans Hogenberg von 1604
 Epitaph of Ernest of Bavaria 

1554 births
1612 deaths
Nobility from Munich
House of Wittelsbach
Archbishop-Electors of Cologne
Ernest 01
16th-century Roman Catholic archbishops in the Holy Roman Empire
17th-century Roman Catholic archbishops in the Holy Roman Empire
Burials at Cologne Cathedral
Prince-Bishops of Liège
Prince-Bishops of Münster
Roman Catholic Prince-Bishops of Freising
Ernest 02
German people of the Eighty Years' War
Abbots of Stavelot
Sons of monarchs